Le Best of (also titled Ailleurs comme ici) is the name of the first compilation recorded by the French singer Hélène Ségara. It contains all Ségara's songs previously released as singles from her previous three albums (except "Au Nom d'une Femme" and the promotional singles), including the duets with Andrea Bocelli and Laura Pausini, plus three new songs, "Ailleurs comme ici", which was the only single from this album, "Je t'aimerai" and "Ne me laisse jamais partir". Released on November 26, 2004, Ailleurs comme ici was a moderate success in the three countries in which it was charted, in comparison with Ségara's previous albums.

Track listing

Charts

Certifications and sales

References

2004 greatest hits albums
Hélène Ségara albums